Ground Xero is the first studio album by the American DJ group Ill Insanity, which consists of three members of the New York City DJ group The X-Ecutioners, Rob Swift, Total Eclipse and DJ Precision. It was released on February 11, 2008, by Ablist Productions and was produced by Swift, Total Eclipse and DJ Precision, with additional production by Roc Raida of The X-Ecutioners and DJ Q-Bert.

Track listing
"Halftime Intro"
"The Prelude"
"P Bounce"
"Fingers of Death" (featuring DJ Q-Bert)
"Nonverbal Communication"
"Break Ill"
"Scratch Live" (featuring Roc Raida)
"Insane Style"
"Ill Insanity"
"Sound Science"
"Soul Train Line"
"We Don't Stop"
"Decorated Vets"
"Halftime Outro"

External links 
 The X-Ecutioners at Rolling Stone
 The X-Ecutioners at IGN Music

2008 albums
The X-Ecutioners albums